Focus on Algebra was the widely cited 812-page-long algebra textbook which contained significant content outside the traditional field of mathematics. The real-life context, intended to make mathematics more relevant, included chili recipes, ancient myths, and photographs of famous people.

Although it was a widely used textbook, it made headlines when it was dubbed "rainforest algebra" by  critics.

Senate Testimony 
Senator Robert Byrd, Democrat from West Virginia, joined critics of reform mathematics on the floor of the senate by dubbing Addison-Wesley Secondary Math: An Integrated Approach: Focus on Algebra the "Texas rainforest algebra book,". It had received an "F" grade on a report card produced by Mathematically Correct, a back-to-basics group, who claimed that it had no algebraic content on the first hundred pages.

Structure 

Each of the 10 Chapters was composed of two or three themes, or "Superlessons," each of which connected the algebraic content to another discipline. Each Superlesson began with an opening page with discussion questions relating to the theme. Critics of the programs cited these questions as evidence of the lack of math in the books.

Examples of questions cited:

 What other kinds of pollution besides air pollution might threaten our planet? [page 163, in the introduction to 3-1 Functional Relationships]
 Each year the Oilfield Chili Appreciation Society holds a chili cook-off. . . . 1. The chili cook-off raises money for charity. Describe some ways the organizers could raise money in the cook- off. 2. What is the hottest kind of pepper that you have eaten? People who have tasted them agree that cayenne peppers are hotter than pimento peppers. How would you set up a hotness scale for peppers? . . . . [page 217, in the introduction to 4-1 Solving Linear Equations]
 What role should zoos play in today's society? . . . . [page 233, in the introduction to 4-2 Other Techniques for Solving Linear Equations]

Exercises within lessons that related to the theme were also criticized. One example:

 Creative Writing The zoo sponsors a creative writing contest for high school students. The topic for the essay this year is "Why should we save an endangered species? The prize winners will split a $9000 scholarship. The prize for first place is 3 times that of third place. The prize for second place is $1500 more than that for third place. a. How much money will be awarded for each place? b. If you were in charge of awarding the prizes, would you have awarded the same amounts for the places. Why or why not? c. Suppose you are a judge. What would you use as criteria for judging the essay? [page 253]

See also 

 Mathematically Correct
 Traditional mathematics
 NCTM standards

References

 Rain-Forest Algebra and MTV Geometry Marianne M. Jennings

Mathematics textbooks
Education reform
Mathematics education reform
Addison-Wesley books